Iké Dominique Ugbo (born 21 September 1998) is a professional soccer player who plays as a forward for Ligue 1 club Troyes. Born in England, he represents the Canada national team.

Born in England, Ugbo grew up in Canada and played youth soccer there before returning to England, where he played with the youth team of Chelsea. He had loan spells at Barnsley, Milton Keynes Dons, Scunthorpe United, Roda JC and Cercle Brugge, before signing for Genk in 2021.

He represented England at under-17 and under-20 youth levels, before making his senior international debut for Canada in 2021.

Early life
Ugbo was born in Lewisham, Greater London, to Nigerian parents. He moved to Canada with his family when he was four or five. In Canada, he played youth soccer with Brampton East SC and Woodbridge Strikers, winning an international under-10 tournament at Disney in 2008 with the latter.

Upon his return to the UK, he joined the Chelsea Academy at under-10 level. He won the UEFA Youth League with Chelsea in 2014–15 and 2015–16.

Club career

Chelsea
In 2015, he signed his first professional contract with Chelsea, but continued to play for the U17 through U23 sides. On 17 July 2017, Ugbo signed a season-long loan deal with Barnsley. On 5 August 2017, Ugbo made his debut off the bench against Bristol City which resulted in a 3–1 loss. He scored his first professional goal on 26 August against Sunderland. On 3 January 2018, Ugbo's loan spell with Barnsley was terminated, following a lack of game time.

The next day, Ugbo joined League One club Milton Keynes Dons on loan for the remainder of the 2017–18 season. On 6 January 2018, Ugbo made his debut for the club, featuring in a 1–0 third round FA Cup away victory over Queens Park Rangers.

He joined Scunthorpe United on loan in August 2018, alongside Jak Alnwick.

In August 2019, it was announced the striker would head to Holland to spend the season on loan at Roda JC in the Dutch second tier.

On 18 August 2020, he went to Belgian club Cercle Brugge on loan.

Genk
In August 2021, he signed a permanent deal with Belgian club Genk. He made his first competitive appearance on 29 August against Anderlecht as a late substitute for Paul Onuachu and scored on his debut, netting the game-winner in a 1–0 victory.

Troyes
In January 2022, Ugbo joined Troyes of Ligue 1 on loan. He made his debut for Troyes on 13 February, playing the full 90 in a 5–1 defeat to Brest. In Ugbo's third game for Troyes against Rennes on 20 February, he scored his first goal. In August 2022 Troyes announced they had reached a deal with Genk over the permanent transfer of Ugbo, signing him on a four-year deal until 2026.

International career
Ugbo was eligible to represent England (through birth), Canada (through youth residency), and Nigeria (through his parents).

England 
Ugbo has represented England at under-17 and under-20 level. In June 2017, Ugbo represented England U20 at the 2017 Toulon Tournament, scoring the only goal in their 1–0 opening group stage match against Angola and converted a penalty kick in the shootout of the final against Ivory Coast, helping his side win the title.

Canada 
In September 2021, he announced that he had decided to change his international allegiance to Nigeria. However, two months later on 4 November, he instead switched his international allegiance to Canada. The next day he was called up to the team for that month's 2022 FIFA World Cup qualification matches against Costa Rica and Mexico. He made his international debut for Canada in the match against Costa Rica on 12 November, appearing as an 83rd minute substitute. In November 2022, Ugbo was named to Canada's squad for the 2022 FIFA World Cup.

Career statistics

Club

International

References

External links

1998 births
Living people
English people of Nigerian descent
Black British sportspeople
Canadian sportspeople of Nigerian descent
English footballers
Footballers from Lewisham
Canadian soccer players
Association football forwards
Canada men's international soccer players
England youth international footballers
English Football League players
Eerste Divisie players
Belgian Pro League players
Ligue 1 players
Woodbridge Strikers players
Chelsea F.C. players
Barnsley F.C. players
Milton Keynes Dons F.C. players
Scunthorpe United F.C. players
Roda JC Kerkrade players
Cercle Brugge K.S.V. players
K.R.C. Genk players
ES Troyes AC players
English expatriate footballers
English expatriate sportspeople in the Netherlands
Canadian expatriate sportspeople in the Netherlands
Expatriate footballers in the Netherlands
English expatriate sportspeople in Belgium
Canadian expatriate sportspeople in Belgium
Expatriate footballers in Belgium
English expatriate sportspeople in France
Canadian expatriate sportspeople in France
Expatriate footballers in France
2022 FIFA World Cup players